Richard Yeo  (ca 1720–1779) was a British medalist and Chief Engraver at the Royal Mint, in which capacity he supplied patterns for the guinea and five guinea coins of George III. He was a founding member of the Royal Academy of Art, and appears in the group portrait by John Zoffany.

Life
Yeo  first came to public notice in 1746, when he produced the official medal for the battle of Culloden, In the same year he issued, by subscription, another Culloden medal, its reverse showing, the Duke of Cumberland as Hercules trampling upon Discord.  Before producing these medals Yeo had engraved a seal with the head of the Duke of Cumberland, drawn from life.

In 1749 he was appointed assistant engraver to the Royal Mint, and in 1775  succeeded  John Sigismund Tanner as chief engraver, a post he held until his death in 1779.

He was a member of the Incorporated Society of Artists in 1760,  and a founding member of the Royal Academy of Art,  appearing in the group portrait by John Zoffany. He exhibited at the academy in 1769 and 1770. In the first year he showed a plaster cast of a seal, engraved in steel, for the Marquis of Granby,  and three impressions in sealing wax from engravings  on gems. In 1770 he showed a proof of his five guinea piece.

His small collection of coins and medals was sold by auction in  February  1780, along  with his graving tools and colours for painting,  which included what the catalogue called "a quantity of his very curious and much esteemed  lake"

Medals engraved
1746, Culloden Medals
1749  Freemasons of Minorca
1750 Academy of Ancient Music
1752 Chancellor's Medal, Cambridge; 
1760 Captain Wilson's Voyage to China 
He also  made two prize medals for Winchester College, and two of the metal admission tickets for Vauxhall Gardens are signed by him. Several other Vauxhall tickets have been attributed to him, one dating to May 1733.

Notes

Sources

External links

1779 deaths
Year of birth uncertain
Royal Academicians